The 2008 United States presidential election in Nebraska took place on November 4, 2008, as part of the 2008 United States presidential election. Voters chose five electors to the Electoral College, who voted for president and vice president. However, Nebraska is one of the two states of the U.S. that, instead of giving all of its electors to the winner based on its statewide results, allocates just two electoral votes to the winner of the statewide popular vote. The other three electors vote based on their individual congressional district results.

Nebraska, statewide, was not a swing state in 2008. Located in the Great Plains of the United States, it is one of the most staunchly Republican states in the country. While some hypothetical general election match-up polls between Republican John McCain and Democrat Barack Obama showed the race to be seemingly close, they were largely regarded as outliers as more polls released showed McCain leading in double digits. McCain wound up carrying the popular vote in Nebraska by 14.93 points, taking in 56.53% of the total statewide vote. However, Obama narrowly defeated McCain in Nebraska's 2nd congressional district, which contains Omaha and the surrounding areas. Due to Nebraska's system of allocating electoral votes to winners of Congressional Districts, Obama was able to win one electoral vote while John McCain received the state's other four electoral votes. On top of this, his 41.6% of the statewide popular vote is the highest a Democratic presidential candidate has won in the Cornhusker State since Lyndon B. Johnson carried the state in his 1964 landslide.

2008 was the first presidential election ever where Nebraska voted to the left of Arkansas. As of 2020, this remains the last time that a Democrat has won more than 40% of the vote in Nebraska.

Primaries & caucuses
 2008 Nebraska Democratic presidential caucuses
 2008 Nebraska Republican presidential primary

Campaign

Predictions
There were 16 news organizations who made state-by-state predictions of the election. Here are their last predictions before election day:

Polling

McCain led in every single pre-election poll. Since May, he led in each poll by a double-digit margin of victory and each with at least 52% of the vote.

Fundraising
John McCain raised a total of $678,059 in the state, while Barack Obama raised $864,393.

Advertising and visits
Obama spent $55,807 while McCain and the Republican Trust PAC spent a total of just $1,225.
Both Obama and McCain visited the state once. Obama held a downtown rally at Omaha and McCain traveled to both Omaha and Ashland. Palin also visited Omaha once.

Campaign in Omaha
Nebraska has two electoral votes that go to the winner of the popular vote in the state, while the other three are split based on whichever candidate wins the popular vote in each of Nebraska's three congressional districts, all of which have trended Republican in the past elections. However Nebraska's 2nd Congressional District, based in the city of Omaha, is significantly less conservative.

The second CD of Nebraska was actually considered as a battleground area by some, leading the Obama campaign to open a single campaign office in Omaha with 15 staff members to cover the congressional district in September 2008. More than 900 people attended the opening of those offices. Democratic Mayor Mike Fahey of Omaha said that he would do whatever it takes to deliver the electoral vote tied to the 2nd Congressional District to Obama, and the Obama Campaign considered Nebraska's 2nd congressional district "in play". Former Democratic U.S. Senator Bob Kerrey and then senior U.S. Senator Ben Nelson campaigned in the city for Obama.

Analysis
Nebraska, part of the conservative Great Plains region, is one of the most Republican states in the nation. It has only gone Democratic in a presidential election seven times since statehood. Continuing on that trend, McCain won the Cornhusker State by nearly 15 points. Obama was only able to win four counties: Douglas County, which contains Omaha; Lancaster County, which contains the state capital of Lincoln and the University of Nebraska; Saline County; and Thurston County, which contains a Native American reservation and was the only county to be won by John Kerry in 2004. No Democratic presidential nominee since Lyndon B. Johnson's landslide 1964 victory has ever won more than four counties in Nebraska. In 2008, McCain won Nebraska's 1st Congressional District and Nebraska's 3rd Congressional District by fairly safe margins, along with the state as a whole, but Obama managed to carry Nebraska's 2nd Congressional District, based in Omaha, by a slim margin of 1,260 votes, resulting in one of Nebraska's five electoral votes being awarded to Obama. This was a particularly notable win, because with Nebraska's split electoral vote system Obama became the first Democratic presidential candidate to win an electoral vote from Nebraska since 1964.

Obama did particularly well in the state's two most populated counties, Douglas and Lancaster. While John Kerry had lost these counties by double digits, Obama was able to carve out small victories in a state he lost by a landslide.

During the same election, Republicans held the open U.S. Senate seat vacated by Republican Chuck Hagel who retired. Former Republican Governor Mike Johanns easily defeated Democrat Scott Kleeb, a rancher, by 17.46 points. Johanns received 57.52% of the total vote while Kleeb took in 40.06%. At the state level, a candidate known to be a Republican picked up a seat in the nonpartisan and unicameral Nebraska Legislature in 2008.

, this is the last election in which Saline County voted Democratic.

Results

Statewide

By county

Counties that flipped from Republican to Democratic
 Douglas (largest city: Omaha)
 Lancaster (largest city: Lincoln)
 Saline (largest city: Crete)

Congressional district
John McCain carried two of the state's three congressional districts, while Barack Obama carried one congressional district held by a Republican.

Electors

Technically the voters of Nebraska cast their ballots for electors: representatives to the Electoral College. Nebraska is allocated 5 electors because it has 3 congressional districts and 2 senators. All candidates who appear on the ballot or qualify to receive write-in votes must submit a list of 5 electors, who pledge to vote for their candidate and his or her running mate. Whoever wins the majority of votes in the state is awarded 2 electoral votes, and the other 3 are allocated via the individual results of the congressional districts. Their chosen electors then vote for president and vice president. Although electors are pledged to their candidate and running mate, they are not obligated to vote for them. An elector who votes for someone other than his or her candidate is known as a faithless elector.

The electors of each state and the District of Columbia met on December 15, 2008, to cast their votes for president and vice president. The Electoral College itself never meets as one body. Instead the electors from each state and the District of Columbia met in their respective capitols.

The following were the 5 members of the Electoral College from the state. 4 of the electors were pledged to John McCain and Sarah Palin; 2 at large, 1 for each of the 1st and 3rd Congressional districts. 1 was pledged to Barack Obama and Joe Biden:
 Charles Thone is an elector for Nebraska's 1st congressional district pledged to John McCain and Sarah Palin.
 William Forsee is an elector for Nebraska's 2nd congressional district pledged to Barack Obama and Joe Biden.
 D. Neal Smith is an elector for Nebraska's 3rd congressional district pledged to John McCain and Sarah Palin.
 Norman Riffel is an at-large elector pledged to John McCain and Sarah Palin.
 Patricia Dorwart is an at-large elector pledged to John McCain and Sarah Palin.

See also
 United States presidential elections in Nebraska
 Presidency of Barack Obama

References

Nebraska
2008
2008 Nebraska elections